Kathleen Adams may refer to:

 Kathleen M. Adams, American cultural anthropologist
 Kathleen Redding Adams (1890–1993), American teacher and member of the First Congregational Church in Atlanta